United Nations Security Council resolution 537, adopted unanimously on 22 September 1983, after examining the application of Saint Kitts and Nevis for membership in the United Nations, the Council recommended to the General Assembly that Saint Kitts and Nevis be admitted.

See also
 Member states of the United Nations
 List of United Nations Security Council Resolutions 501 to 600 (1982–1987)

References
Text of the Resolution at undocs.org

External links
 

 0537
 0537
 0537
September 1983 events
1983 in Saint Kitts and Nevis